Friedhelm Eicker (born 5 April 1927) is a German statistician and former professor at the University of Dortmund. He is known for his contributions in the development of heteroscedasticity-consistent standard errors.

A native of Radevormwald, Eicker earned his PhD from the University of Mainz in 1956.

References 

1927 births
Living people
German statisticians
Johannes Gutenberg University Mainz alumni
Academic staff of the Technical University of Dortmund